J043947.08+163415.7 is a superluminous quasar, for some time considered the brightest in the early universe with a redshift of z = 6.51. It is approximately 12.873 billion light-years away. The brightness of the quasar is equivalent to about 600 trillion luminosities of the Suns with gravitational lensing, without this effect 11 trillion. The quasar-related supermassive black hole has a mass of 700 million solar masses.

References

Further reading

</ref>
</ref>

Astronomical objects discovered in 2019
Quasars
Supermassive black holes
Taurus (constellation)